The Kamunting Detention Centre (KEMTA) is a prison camp in Kamunting, Larut, Matang and Selama District, Perak, Malaysia. The prison is used by the government to detain and interrogate persons arrested under the Internal Security Act (ISA). The detention is also known as Malaysia's Supermax prison or Maximum security prison. It is alleged that this is the site where the Malaysian authorities would hold up political prisoners. Among notable events which prompted widespread use of the ISA were Operation Lalang in 1987 and the years during the Reformasi movement, beginning 1999. The centre has also been used to detain other groups of people declared by the government to be a threat to national security such as terrorists and cults. Some notable groups detained in Kamunting includes the Al-Arqam cult and the Al-Ma'unah terrorist group.

Population statistics

Notable ex-detainees
 James Wong - Federal opposition leader from Sarawak in 1974
 Anwar Ibrahim - Malaysia's former Deputy Prime Minister.
 Lim Kit Siang - Opposition leader
 Jeffrey Kitingan - Deputy Chief Minister of Sabah
 Karpal Singh - Opposition leader
 Michael Jeyakumar Devaraj - Parti Sosialis Malaysia leader
 Lim Guan Eng - former Finance Minister
 Mohamad Sabu - former Defence Minister
 Teresa Kok - former  Primary Industry Minister
 Tuang Pik King - Civil rights activist

References

Prisons in Malaysia
Buildings and structures in Perak
1973 establishments in Malaysia
Politics of Malaysia
Terrorism in Malaysia
Islamism in Malaysia
Communism in Malaysia
Larut, Matang and Selama District